Calculator is a software calculator application for the Nintendo Switch developed and published by Sabec Limited. It contains the functions of a standard scientific calculator. Released on May 12, 2021, it was widely criticized for having equivalent functionality to alternative free or pre-installed software while being a paid application.

Functions 
Calculator has the functions of a standard scientific calculator, such as the ability to process trigonometric functions.

Development and release 
Calculator was developed and published by Sabec Limited.

Reception 
Calculator was widely criticized for having equivalent functionality to free applications, particularly those pre-installed on smartphones, and Eurogamer and GameSpot noted the application's visual resemblance to the Calculator software by Apple Inc. TechRadar said that Nintendo's decision to allow Calculator to release on their platform "shows that, ultimately, Nintendo is happy to take its cut from anyone daft enough to pay for it" rather than enforce strict quality control. Kotaku said that, while the Nintendo Switch is "technically capable" of being a calculator, they feel that "a Nintendo Switch is better suited to being a Bayonetta 3 machine than a homework helper".

The application became an internet meme, and was jokingly considered as the best game of all time by fans. A speedrun of the application was also created, in which one attempts to manually count to 1,000 as fast as possible.

Notes

References 

Nintendo Switch-only games
Utility software
Software calculators
Nintendo Switch games
2021 video games
Video game memes
Internet memes introduced in 2021